The 1996 United States presidential election in North Carolina took place on 5 November 1996 as part of the 1996 United States presidential election.  Voters in North Carolina chose 14 representatives, or electors to the Electoral College, who voted for president and vice president.

North Carolina was narrowly won by the Republican nominee, Senator Bob Dole of Kansas, defeating incumbent Democratic President Bill Clinton of Arkansas. Dole won with a plurality of 48.73% of the vote to Clinton's 44.04%, a margin of 4.69%. The Reform Party candidate, billionaire businessman Ross Perot, came in a distant third, with 6.68%.  

In 1992, Clinton became the first Democrat to win the White House without carrying North Carolina since the founding of the Republican Party and the only Democrat to ever secure two terms in office without North Carolina. Although the state remained competitive in 1996, Dole improved non-trivially on George H. W. Bush's margin on his way to becoming the second losing Republican to carry the state, reflecting the state's increasingly Republican orientation. Much of Dole's strength came from wins in large counties anchored by, or adjoining, an urban area. He flipped Wake County, home of Raleigh and the largest county in the nation he flipped outside California, carrying it by 2.3%. His top two raw vote margins in the state came from Gaston County, a suburban county adjoining Mecklenburg County (home of Charlotte), and Forsyth County, home of Winston-Salem; in the latter, he increased Bush's '92 margin of 3.2% to 11.3%. He also shrank Bill Clinton's margin in Guilford County, home of Greensboro, from 4.2% to 1.0%. (Clinton did, however, flip Mecklenburg County itself.) 

, this is the last election in which the following counties have voted for a Democratic presidential candidate: Camden, Duplin, Franklin, Haywood, Jones, Madison, Montgomery, Perquimans and Swain.

Results

Results by county

Electors 
Technically the voters of North Carolina cast their ballots for electors: representatives to the Electoral College.  North Carolina was allocated 14 electors because it had 12 congressional districts and 2 senators.  All candidates that appear on the ballot or qualify to receive write-in votes must submit a list of 14 electors, who pledge to vote for their candidate and his or her running mate. Whoever wins the majority of votes in the state is awarded all 14 electoral votes.  Their chosen electors then vote for president and vice president.  Although electors are pledged to their candidate and running mate, they are not obligated to vote for them. An elector who votes for someone other than his or her candidate is known as a faithless elector.

The following were the members of the Electoral College from the state. All were pledged to and voted for Bob Dole and Jack Kemp:
 Howard B. Smith
 Bettie West
 J.D. Teachey
 Nelson Dollar
 Lee Q. McMillan
 Carolyn McGee
 Jim Cole
 Tom Dwiggins
 John Van Hanford
 Gary Whitener
 George Alexander Jones
 Quentine Finch 
 Bill Graham
 Dorothy Bursey

References

North Carolina
1996
1996 North Carolina elections